Tennis events were contested at the 1999 Summer Universiade in Palma de Majorca, Spain.

Medal summary

Medal table

See also
 Tennis at the Summer Universiade

External links
World University Games Tennis on HickokSports.com

1999
Universiade
1999 Summer Universiade